Charles Henry "Chip" Beck (born September 12, 1956) is an American golfer who was a three-time All-American at the University of Georgia. He has four victories on the PGA Tour and twenty runner-up finishes. He spent 40 weeks in the top 10 of the Official World Golf Rankings between 1988 and 1989.

Beck was born in Fayetteville, North Carolina. He was the runner-up at the 1993 Masters Tournament, and was tied for runner-up at the 1986 and 1989 U.S. Open championships. He is also noted for his stellar play at the 1991 Ryder Cup held at the Kiawah Island Golf Resort and is a three-time Ryder Cup participant, also playing in 1989 and 1993 at The Belfry Golf & Country Club in Sutton Coldfield, England. He won the Vardon Trophy in 1988.

Beck shot a round of 59 in the third round of the 1991 Las Vegas Invitational on the Sunrise Golf Club (par 72) in Las Vegas, Nevada, one of only six players in the history of the PGA Tour ever to do so. His round included 5 pars and 13 birdies (a PGA Tour record for birdies in one round) including a three footer on the 18th hole. Beck finished tied for third in the tournament. He also shot a hole-in-one (also a double eagle) at the par-4 9th hole in the first round of the 2003 Omaha Classic, a Nationwide Tour event. It was the first in Nationwide Tour history and second recorded in the history of the PGA Tour umbrella combined.

Beck missed 46 consecutive PGA Tour cuts from 1997 to 1998 and eventually left the PGA Tour to become an insurance salesman.

In 2006, Beck became eligible for the Champions Tour and enjoyed newfound success. He currently resides in Lake Forest, Illinois. In 2015, Beck stepped away from competition to become an ambassador at Grey Oaks Country Club in Naples, Florida.

Professional wins (5)

PGA Tour wins (4)

PGA Tour playoff record (0–2)

Japan Senior Tour wins (1)
2007 Kinojyo Senior Open

Results in major championships

CUT = missed the half way cut (3rd round cut in 1982 Open Championship)
"T" indicates a tie for a place.

Summary

Most consecutive cuts made – 11 (1987 PGA – 1990 U.S. Open)
Longest streak of top-10s – 2 (1989 Masters – 1989 U.S. Open)

Results in The Players Championship

CUT = missed the halfway cut
"T" indicates a tie for a place

U.S. national team appearances
Professional
Dunhill Cup: 1988
Four Tours World Championship: 1988 (winners), 1989 (winners)
Ryder Cup: 1989 (tie), 1991 (winners), 1993 (winners)

See also
Fall 1978 PGA Tour Qualifying School graduates
Fall 1979 PGA Tour Qualifying School graduates
Lowest rounds of golf

References

External links

American male golfers
Georgia Bulldogs men's golfers
PGA Tour golfers
PGA Tour Champions golfers
Ryder Cup competitors for the United States
Golfers from North Carolina
Sportspeople from Fayetteville, North Carolina
1956 births
Living people